Muricanthus callidinus is a species of sea snail, a marine gastropod mollusc in the family Muricidae, the murex snails or rock snails.

Distribution
This marine species occurs from Guatemala to Costa Rica to off Puerto Pizarro, Tumbes Province, Peru.

References

 Berry, S.S. (1958) Notices of new Eastern Pacific Mollusca.-II. Leaflets in Malacology, 1, 83–90.
 Merle D., Garrigues B. & Pointier J.-P. (2011) Fossil and Recent Muricidae of the world. Part Muricinae. Hackenheim: Conchbooks. 648 pp. note: treated as synonym of M. ambiguus
 Houart, R. & Wiedrick, S.G. (2021). Review of Muricanthus Swainson, 1840 and some Recent species assigned to Hexaplex s.s. Perry, 1810, Hexaplex (Trunculariopsis) Cossmann, 1921 and Phyllonotus Swainson, 1833. Novapex. 22(1-2): 25-42.

External links
 Broderip, W. J.; Sowerby, G. B., I. (1832-1833). [Descriptions of new species of shells from the collection formed by Mr. Cuming on the western coast of South America, and among the islands of the southern Pacific Ocean.. Proceedings of the Committee of Science and correspondence of the Zoological Society of London. 2]
 Hertz C.M. (1999). Illustration of the types named by S. Stillman Berry in his "Leaflets in Malacology" revised. The Festivus. 31, supplement: 1-43

Muricidae
Gastropods described in 1958